David Thomas Armstrong (born 9 November 1942) is an English former professional footballer who played as a left winger in the Football League for Millwall and Brighton & Hove Albion.

Life and career
Armstrong was born in Mile End, London, in 1942. A left-footed winger with considerable pace, he played amateur football for Barking, Ilford and Hornchurch, and played for the England amateur team in a trial match in November 1965, but turned professional with Millwall a few weeks later. He made three appearances as Millwall were promoted to the Second Division, and a further 17 at that level, before returning to the third tier with Brighton & Hove Albion in September 1968 for a £5,000 fee. He played in 44 matches in all competitions, was released at the end of the 1969–70 season, and moved back into non-league football with Dover and Wimbledon.

References

1942 births
Living people
Footballers from Mile End
English footballers
Association football wingers
Barking F.C. players
Ilford F.C. players
Hornchurch F.C. players
Millwall F.C. players
Brighton & Hove Albion F.C. players
Dover F.C. players
Wimbledon F.C. players
Isthmian League players
English Football League players
Southern Football League players